Mahalia Murphy (born 19 January 1994) is an Australian rugby league and rugby union footballer who has represented Australia in both codes.

In 2015, she made her rugby league Test debut for Australia before switching to rugby union and representing Australia in 2017.

Background
Born in Blacktown, New South Wales, Murphy played her junior rugby league for the Doonside Roos and attended Hills Sports High School.

Playing career

Rugby league
In 2013, while playing for the Redfern All Blacks, Murphy represented the Indigenous All Stars. On 3 May 2015, Murphy made her Test debut for Australia, scoring a hat-trick in a 22–14 win over New Zealand. In June 2015, she made her debut for New South Wales in a 4–all draw with Queensland.

On 24 September 2020, Murphy returned to rugby league, joining the St George Illawarra Dragons NRL Women's Premiership team. In Round 1 of the 2020 NRLW season, she made her debut for the Dragons, coming off the bench in a 18–4 loss to the Sydney Roosters.

Rugby union
In July 2015, Murphy represented Australia at the Pacific Games in Papua New Guinea. In 2017, she represented Australia at the 2017 Women's Rugby World Cup. In 2019, she joined the New South Wales Waratahs Super W team.

Murphy was named in Australia's squad for the 2022 Pacific Four Series in New Zealand. She made the Wallaroos squad for a two-test series against the Black Ferns at the Laurie O'Reilly Cup. She was also selected in the team for the delayed 2022 Rugby World Cup in New Zealand.

References

External links
St George Illawarra Dragons profile
Wallaroos profile

1994 births
Living people
Australian female rugby league players
Australian female rugby union players
Australia women's national rugby league team players
Australia women's international rugby union players
Rugby league wingers
Rugby league centres
Rugby union wings
St. George Illawarra Dragons (NRLW) players